Twist & Shout is the second studio album by the Isley Brothers, released on Wand Records in 1962. The album was released on the success of the title track, which would later become a hit for the Beatles. Other songs on the album include Isley-penned tracks such as "Right Now", "Nobody but Me" and the charter, "Twistin' with Linda".

In 1964, the record label rereleased and renamed Twist & Shout as Take Some Time Out for The Famous Isley Brothers, due to the popularity of the Beatles' rendition of "Twist & Shout". The album cover of Take Some Time Out for The Famous Isley Brothers is a picture of the trio performing in a night club.

The album peaked at No. 61 on the Billboard Top Pop Albums chart.

Track listing

Personnel
The Isley Brothers
Ronald Isley – lead vocals
O'Kelly Isley, Jr. and Rudolph Isley – background vocals
Technical
Tom Owen – engineer

References

External links
 The Isley Brothers – Twist & Shout (1962) album releases & credits at Discogs

1962 albums
The Isley Brothers albums
Albums produced by Bert Berns
Wand Records albums